Halone flavinigra is a moth of the subfamily Arctiinae. It was described by George Hampson in 1907. It is known from India.

References

 

Lithosiini
Moths described in 1907